Toyota Kirloskar Motor Private Limited (TKM) is an Indian joint venture between Toyota Motor Corporation (89%) and Kirloskar Group (11%), for the manufacture and sales of Toyota cars in India. The headquarters are located in Bidadi, Karnataka, near Bengaluru.

History 
Toyota Motor Corporation entered India in 1997 in a joint venture with the Kirloskar Group. Toyota Motor Corporation (TMC) holds 89% of the share and the remaining 11% is owned by Kirloskar Group. It is based in Bidadi, Karnataka, near Bengaluru.

The company released its first product in the Indian automotive market with the launch of the Qualis in 2000. Occupying the multi utility vehicle (MUV) segment, sales of the model grew within a short span of 2 years to capture 20 per cent market share from established local manufacturers such as Mahindra and Tata Motors. In 2002 and 2003, Toyota introduced the Camry and Corolla respectively.

In 2005, TKM launched the Innova to replace the Qualis, which is based on a modern IMV platform. Later, new models were introduced including the IMV series Fortuner SUV in 2009 and Hilux pickup truck in 2022. To support the new products, the sales and service network was developed further from 22 outlets in 2000 to 166 in 2011, and 359 in 2019.

Under the Entry Family Car (EFC) project, TKM started producing the Etios in 2010 as the company's first entry-level model. Production of the vehicle created more than 2,000 jobs at TKM's newly-built second plant and approximately 500 jobs at Toyota Kirloskar Auto Parts Private Limited.

In 2017, Toyota introduced its luxury brand Lexus in the country.

Suzuki partnership 
Toyota started considering its partnership agreement with Suzuki in the Indian market in 2016. In 2017, both companies agreed to market electric vehicles in the country. In 2018 and 2019, Toyota outlined its initial plan for the partnership with Suzuki, including receiving supply of Baleno, Vitara Brezza, Ciaz and Ertiga models from Suzuki, and supplying the Corolla to Suzuki. Plans also included production of the Suzuki-developed SUV at TKM from 2022 and the production of hybrid electric vehicles in India. In 2019, TKM released the Glanza as a rebadged Baleno, and the Urban Cruiser as a rebadged Vitara Brezza in 2020. In 2022, TKM released the Urban Cruiser Hyryder, which is developed by Suzuki, produced by TKM while incorporating the Toyota Hybrid System.

Manufacturing facilities 
TKMPL's current plant at Bidadi, Karnataka is spread across 850 acres and has a capacity of 110,000 vehicles per annum. TKMPL's second manufacturing plant on the outskirts of Bengaluru, Karnataka has a capacity of 210,000 vehicles per annum. Total production capacity is 320,000 vehicles per annum. On 16 March 2011, it announced that it was increasing production to 210,000 vehicles per annum due to increase in demand for its models especially the Etios and Fortuner.

Industrial relations 

On 16 March 2014, Toyota Kirloskar Motor temporarily suspended the production at two of its assembly plants in Bidadi, Karnataka whose production capacity was 310,000 units annually and has employee strength of 6,400. Cause for the shutdown was failure to reach an agreement with the union over the issue of wages, deliberate stoppages of the production line by certain sections of the employees and abusing & threatening of supervisors thereby disrupting the production for the past 25 days. Toyota Kirloskar Motor announced on 21 March 2014 to lift the lockout at the plants effective from 24 March 2014 with subject to an acceptance of a service condition which requires all the employees signing an undertaking on good conduct. On 22 April 2014, employees called off the strike after 36 days of standoff and resumed full operations.

Etios motor racing 

Toyota India started a One make racing series in India with the Etios car called the 'Etios Motor Racing Series'. The series started in 2012, it witnessed an overwhelming response from the Indian youngsters, with 3300 applicants. They held 2 rounds of exhibition races in 2012, one at a purpose built race track in Chennai called the Sriperumbudur race track and other in the form of ROC (Race of champions) in Gurgaon. The 25 selected drivers then competed in the main championship held in the later half of 2013. The cars were prepared by Red Rooster Performance (based in Bangalore), and designed by TRD (Toyota Racing Development). With stock engines producing almost 100 bhp, the cars were a good platform for youngsters to step from karting to touring cars. Also the relatively cheaper budget of just $3216 for the entire series which includes an entire OMP racing kit makes it one of the best one-make series to compete in.

Models

Current models

Toyota

Lexus
 Lexus ES300h (2020–present)

Discontinued models
 Toyota Qualis (2000–2004)
 Toyota Corolla Altis (2003–2020)
 Toyota Land Cruiser Prado (2004–2020)
 Toyota Innova (2005–2016)
 Toyota Prius (2010–2015, 2017–2020)
 Toyota Land Cruiser (2010–2020)
 Toyota Etios (2010–2019)
 Toyota Etios Liva (2011–2019)
 Toyota Etios Cross (2014–2016)
 Toyota Yaris (2018–2021)
 Lexus NX300h (2020–2021)
 Toyota Urban Cruiser (2020) (2020–2022)

Sales and service network 
As of April 2019, it has more than 350 dealerships in 225 cities across India.

Sales performance 
TKMPL sold 74,759 vehicles in India in the year 2010 registering a growth rate of 38% compared to 2009 sales.

See also 
Toyota Motor Corporation
Automobile industry in India

References 

Vehicle manufacturing companies established in 1997
Car manufacturers of India
Toyota subsidiaries
Kirloskar Group
Indian subsidiaries of foreign companies
1997 establishments in Karnataka
Indian companies established in 1997